Caroline Elizabeth Mary Stuart-Wortley, Baroness Wharncliffe (née Crichton; 1779–1856), styled Lady Caroline Crichton from 1789 until her marriage, was an Irish-born British aristocrat and female artist known for her landscape and figurative drawing and painting. A number of these artworks are in the Tate collection and archives.

Biography
Lady Caroline Elizabeth Mary Crichton was the daughter of John Crichton, 1st Earl Erne by his second wife, the former Lady Mary Caroline Hervey, daughter of Frederick Hervey, 4th Earl of Bristol and elder sister of the notorious Lady Elizabeth Foster.

She married James Stuart-Wortley, 1st Baron Wharncliffe and had four children;  
John Stuart-Wortley-Mackenzie, 2nd Baron Wharncliffe (1801–1855)
Hon. Charles Stuart-Wortley-Mackenzie (1802–1844)
Hon. James Archibald Stuart-Wortley (1805–1881), Solicitor-General
Hon. Caroline Jane Stuart-Wortley-Mackenzie (d. 12 June 1876), married on 30 August 1830 Hon. John Chetwynd-Talbot (1806–1852)

There are four portraits of her as a child in the National Trust Collection.

Lord Wharncliffe died in December 1845, aged 69, and was succeeded in the barony by his eldest son, John, whose son Edward, 3rd Baron was created Earl of Wharncliffe in 1876. Elizabeth, Dowager Baroness Wharncliffe died in April 1856.

Personal life 
Lady Wharncliffe was the daughter of John Creighton, 1st Earl Erne and the granddaughter of Lord Stuart of Wortley, the first Conservative to be elected as a Member of Parliament for Sheffield. She married Lord Wharncliffe on 30 March 1799. They had four children:
 John Stuart-Wortley-Mackenzie, 2nd Baron Wharncliffe (1801–1855)
 Hon. Charles Stuart-Wortley-Mackenzie (1802–1844)
 Hon. James Archibald Stuart-Wortley (1805–1881), Solicitor-General
 Hon. Caroline Jane Stuart-Wortley-Mackenzie (d. 12 June 1876), married on 30 August 1830 Hon. John Chetwynd-Talbot (1806–1852)

Works 
55 works, including one landscape painting and a series of sketches of models, by Lady Wharncliffe can be found, in the Tate Collection and Archive.

Bibliography 
The book 'The first Lady Wharncliffe and her family (1779-1856); v.1 / by her grandchildren Caroline Grosvenor and the late Charles Beilby, Lord Stuart of Wortley.  1927' is in the Royal Collection Trust.

Further reading 
Lady Wharncliffe's letters are kept by the National Archives.

References

1779 births
1856 deaths
19th-century British painters
19th-century British women artists
British artists
British women painters
British baronesses
Daughters of Irish earls